Zinkensdamm is an area and a former manor in Södermalm in inner Stockholm. The Zinkensdamm manor was demolished. The name is today used for Zinkensdamm metro station and the sports ground Zinkensdamms IP.

History
Wealthy customs manager Wilhelm Böös Drakenhielm, who was active in the mid 17th century, placed his wealth in agricultural real estate. He bought a large property in this area in 1668. The area was mountainous and not suitable to be built upon, and Drakenhielm probably bought the land to have some carp ponds, which was considered "a must" for a wealthy person of that time.

After Drakenhielm's finances deteriorated, royal councillor Claes Fleming (1649-1685) took over. Following his death in 1685, in the same year, his widow Anna Cruus sold the property to the merchant Frantz Zinck, who was a large supplier of textiles to the Swedish crown, for a sum of 36,000 Swedish riksdaler (copper). Zinck did however have problems in paying the full amount, and did therefore not hold the title to the property when he died in 1690. Despite this, the area still carries his name.

Sports
Zinkensdamms IP has hosted matches in the Bandy World Championship several times. In 2006 it was the main arena where the final was played. It is the home ground for bandy club Hammarby IF.

Literature
Arne Munthe: Västra Södermalm intill mitten av 1800-talet (1959) ("Western Södermalm until the mid 19th century")

Geography of Stockholm